Jack Gilbert Ashenden (12 May 1911 – 14 November 1992) was a New Zealand cricketer who played first-class cricket for Wellington from 1936 to 1945.

A right-arm medium-pace bowler, Ashenden partnered Tom Pritchard in opening the bowling for Wellington in the 1938-39 Plunket Shield, when he and Pritchard were two of only six players in the competition to take 10 wickets or more. He took 6 for 44 in the second innings of the innings victory over Otago. At the end of the season he played for New Zealand against Sir Julien Cahn's XI.

References

External links

1911 births
1992 deaths
New Zealand cricketers
Wellington cricketers